Volgabus (known as Volzhanin until 2008) is a Russian bus manufacturing company  located in the city of Volzhsky Volgograd region, and includes leasing company, a distribution center, a network of dealers, and logistics center. The general manager is Alex Bakulin, son of the vice-speaker of the Volgograd Regional Duma.

History
The company was founded in 1993, the first five years leasing buses made by the Likinskiy Bus plant. Volgabus was the first company in Russia to manufacture low-floor buses with aluminum body and electronic control systems. Revenues in 2004 exceeded 625 million rubles. In 2005, they produced 240 buses.

In 2011 it announced the launch of a compressed natural gas-powered bus, in partnership with Gazprom. In 2015 the company had revenues of 3.2 billion rubles, making it the third largest bus manufacturer in the country.

In 2016 Volgabus presented a prototype of an electronic driverless bus at the Skolkovo Innovation Center, the first such vehicle to be developed in Russia.

Products
The company currently produces urban, suburban, and intercity buses, and special purpose vehicles under the brand "Volzhanin", or "Volgabus" in foreign markets.

Urban buses 

Volzhanin-32901 – small alternative to the minibus
Volzhanin-5270 – large bus, designed for multi-purpose use on regular routes
Volzhanin-6270 – one-section, large capacity bus
Volzhanin-5270.06 "Sitiritm-12" – low-floor bus with a body made of aluminum alloy
Volzhanin-6270.06 "Sitiritm 15" – low-floor city high capacity bus with a body made of aluminum alloy
Volzhanin-6271 "SITIRITM-18" – urban low-floor bus with extra-large capacity and a jointed body made of aluminum alloy
Volgabus-4298
Volgabus-6271 – built upon the technical requirements for Moscow; has an articulated 18-meter stainless steel body, automatic transmission and a new generation of engine, similar to the bus LiAZ 6213

Commuter buses 
Volzhanin-32901 – small commuter bus
Volzhanin 52701 – large commuter bus

Intercity coaches 
Volzhanin 52851 – designed for long-distance intercity routes
Volzhanin-52702 – mid-range intercity coach

Special purpose buses 
Volzhanin-52851 VIP – designed for comfort to accommodate business trips of senior executives
Mobile library Volzhanin 52701 – Library bus
Volzhanin-6216 Invalid – intercity bus transportation for wheelchair users
Volzhanin-6216 Sports – sports freight and passenger bus to transport the team Motocross
Volzhanin-52702 Blood Service – a mobile blood collection point
Volzhanin-52851 Fire – Mobile fire headquarters

Gallery

References

Literature

External links 
Official site

Bus manufacturers of Russia
Companies based in Volgograd Oblast
Russian brands